The Trumpeter breeds of fancy pigeon are so named because of their unique vocalizations which sound vaguely like low laughter. Wendell Levi describes this trumpeting vocalization in his book The Pigeon. 
There are several domesticated varieties that possess this "trumpeting" ability to various degrees. Some of the more popular are:

Arabian Trumpeter
Bokhara Trumpeter
Dresden Trumpeter
Altenburger Trumpeter
English Trumpeter
Franconian Trumpeter
Bangladeshi Trumpeter

See also 

List of pigeon breeds

References 

Domestic pigeons